International Festival for Vocal Music "a cappella" is an international music festival for a cappella music held annually in Leipzig, Germany. It was founded by the ensemble amarcord.

Ensembles

References

External links
Official site

Music festivals in Germany
Events in Leipzig